Prototaxites  is a genus of terrestrial fossil fungi dating from the Middle Ordovician until the Late Devonian periods, approximately .

Whilst traditionally very difficult to assign to an extant group of organisms, current opinion suggests a fungal placement for the genus. Its exact relationship with extant fungus lineages is uncertain. It was almost certainly a perennial organism that grew over multiple years. Several ecologies have been proposed, including that it was saprotrophic like many modern fungi, or that it was a lichenised autotroph.

Morphology

Viewed from afar, the fossils take the form of tree-trunks, spreading slightly near their base in a fashion that suggests a connection to unpreserved root-like structures. Infilled casts which may represent the spaces formerly occupied by "roots" of Prototaxites are common in early Devonian strata. Concentric growth rings, sometimes containing embedded plant material, suggest that the organism grew sporadically by the addition of external layers. It is probable that the preserved "trunks" represent the fruiting body, or "sporophore", of a fungus, which would have been fuelled by a mycelium, a net of dispersed filaments ("hyphae"). On a microscopic scale, the fossils consist of narrow tube-like structures, which weave around one another. These come in two types: skeletal "tubes", 20–50 μm across, have thick (2–6 μm) walls and are undivided for their length, and generative "filaments", which are thinner (5–10 μm diameter) and branch frequently; these mesh together to form the organism's matrix. These thinner filaments are septate—that is to say, they bear internal walls. These septa are perforate—i.e. they contain a pore, a trait only present in the modern red algae and fungi.

The similarity of these tubes to structures in the early plant Nematothallus has led to suggestions that the latter may represent leaves of Prototaxites. Unfortunately for this hypothesis, the two have never been found in connection, although this may be a consequence of their detachment after the organisms' death.

History of research
First collected in 1843, it was not until 14 years later that John William Dawson, a Canadian scientist, studied Prototaxites fossils, which he described as partially rotten giant conifers, containing the remains of the fungi which had been decomposing them. This concept was not disputed until 1872, when the rival scientist William Carruthers poured ridicule on the idea. Such was his fervour that he rebuked the name Prototaxites (loosely translated as "first yew") and insisted that the name Nematophycus ("stringy alga") be adopted, a move strongly against scientific convention. Dawson fought adamantly to defend his original interpretation until studies of the microstructure made it clear that his position was untenable, whence he promptly attempted to rename the genus himself (to Nematophyton, "stringy plant"), denying with great vehemence that he'd ever considered it to be a tree. Despite these political attempts to rename the genus, the rules of botanical nomenclature mean that the name "Prototaxites", however inappropriate in meaning, remains in use today.

Despite the overwhelming evidence that the organism grew on land, Carruthers's interpretation that it was a giant marine alga was challenged just the once, in 1919, when Church suggested that Carruthers had been too quick to rule out the possibility of the fungi. The lack of any characters diagnostic of any extant group made the presentation of a firm hypothesis difficult; the fossil remained an enigmatic mystery and subject of debate. It was not until 2001, after 20 years of research, that Francis Hueber, of Washington's National Museum of Natural History, published a long-awaited paper which attempted to put Prototaxites in its place. The paper deduced, based on its morphology, that Prototaxites was a fungus.

This idea was received with disbelief, denial and strong scepticism, but further evidence is emerging to support it. In 2007, isotopic analyses by a team including Hueber and Kevin Boyce of the University of Chicago concluded that Prototaxites was a giant fungus. They detected a highly variable range of values of carbon isotope ratios in a range of Prototaxites specimens; autotrophs (organisms such as plants and algae, that make a living via photosynthesis) living at the same time draw on the same (atmospheric) source of carbon; as organisms of the same type share the same chemical machinery, they reflect this atmospheric composition with a constant carbon isotope trace. The inconsistent ratio observed in Prototaxites appears to show that the organism did not survive by photosynthesis, and Boyce's team deduced that the organism fed on a range of substrates, such as the remains of whichever other organisms were nearby. Nevertheless, the large size of the organism would necessitate an extensive network of subterranean mycelia in order to obtain enough organic carbon to accumulate the necessary biomass. Root-like structures have circumstantially been interpreted as Prototaxitess rhizomorphs, and could support the possibility of the organism transporting nutrients large distances to support its above-ground body.

Other recent research has suggested that Prototaxites represents a rolled-up bundle of liverworts, but this interpretation has substantial difficulties.

A similar genus, Nematasketum, also consists of banded and branching tubes in axial bundles; this seems to be a fungus.

A 2022 paper suggested that Prototaxites was a fungal rhizomorph that grew on its side and likely at least partially underground, as opposed to the traditional view that it grew upright.

SpeciesPrototaxites honeggeri''' is the oldest known described species Prototaxites, known from the Darriwilian age Douglas Lake Member of the Lenoir Limestone, at Douglas Dam, Tennessee. P. honeggeri is a small species with simple erect trunk and 4-5 club-shaped terminal branches furrowed by transverse wrinkles.P. honeggeri is similar to other species, but much smaller, about the size of a pencil. It was lichenized by small coccoids, probably green algal, attached to generative hyphae.

Ecological contextPrototaxites would have been the tallest living organism in its day by far.  In comparison, the plant Cooksonia only reached 6 cm, and itself towered over the "moss forests". Invertebrates were the only other land-dwelling multi-cellular life. Prototaxites became extinct as vascular plants rose to prominence. The organism could have used its tall columnar structure for spore dispersal.  Alternatively, if Prototaxites contained photosynthetic structures, the height would have increased light capture. The University of Chicago research team has it reconstructed as a branchless, columnar structure. The presence of bio-molecules often associated with the algae may suggest that the organism was covered by symbiotic (or parasitic) algae (making it in essence a huge lichen), or even that it was an alga itself. However, the variability in the ratios of δ13C between speciemens of Prototaxites suggest that it was heterotrophic.Prototaxites mycelia (strands) have been fossilised invading the tissue of vascular plants; in turn, there is evidence of animals inhabiting Prototaxites: mazes of tubes have been found within some specimens, with the fungus re-growing into the voids, leading to speculation that the organisms' extinction may have been caused by such activity; however, evidence of arthropod borings in Prototaxites has been found from the early and late Devonian, suggesting the organism survived the duress of boring for many millions of years. Intriguingly, Prototaxites'' was bored long before plants developed a structurally equivalent woody stem, and it is possible that the borers transferred to plants when these evolved.

References

External links 
Images and discussion of the classification of Prototaxites

 
 
(broken link)Paul Stamets TED talk "Prototaxites" at 5'59"
updated: https://www.ted.com/talks/paul_stamets_6_ways_mushrooms_can_save_the_world

Late Devonian genus extinctions
Devonian fungi
Silurian fungi
Pridoli first appearances
Enigmatic fungus taxa
Fossil taxa described in 1859
Paleozoic life of Ontario
Paleozoic life of New Brunswick